Kalathil Santhippom is a 2021 Indian Tamil language sports action drama film written and directed by N. Rajasekar with dialogues penned by R. Ashok. The film stars Jiiva, Arulnithi, Manjima Mohan and Priya Bhavani Shankar. The film is based on the sport of kabaddi and the friendship between two men Ashok and Anand who were initially regarded as rivals. The film also marked the posthumous release of actor Naadodigal Gopal who died on 5 March 2020 prior to the film release. It had its theatrical release on 5 February 2021 and opened to positive reviews from critics. And became an average hit  at the box office

Plot
Ashok (Jiiva) and Anand (Arulnithi) are rivals on the Kabaddi court but are the thickest of friends outside it. The film essentially is a drama that explores the hurdles they face together with regards to their families and personal romantic relationships, and how they overcome all that.

Cast 

 Jiiva as Ashok
 Arulnithi as Anand
 Manjima Mohan as Kavya
 Priya Bhavani Shankar as Sofia
 Radha Ravi as Appachi
 Robo Shankar as Puli
 Bala Saravanan as "Bottle"
 Ilavarasu as Ashok's father
 Sriranjini  as Ashok's mother
 Naadodigal Gopal as Anand's father
 Renuka as Anand's mother
 Vela Ramamoorthy as Thennarasu, Kavya's father
 Sri Vidhya Shankar as Kavya's mother
 Aadukalam Naren as Sofia's father
 G. Marimuthu as Kasi
 Sampath Ram as "Bullet" Paandi
 Benito Franklin Alex as Alex, Sofia's brother
 Meesai Rajendran as Power Paandi
 I. S. Rajesh as Selvam
 Thavasi as "Bullet" Paandi's father
 Pa. Vijay as himself (guest appearance)
 Prayaga Martin as Ashok's mistaken bride (guest appearance)

Production 
Actor Jiiva's father and veteran film producer R. B. Choudary announced that he would produce the film helmed by filmmaker N. Rajasekar. It marked 90th film project for R. B. Choudary under his production banner Super Good Films. Jiiva and Arulnithi were roped into play as the main male lead actors in the film and it also marked the first collaboration between them. Manjima Mohan and Priya Bhavani Shankar were roped into play the female leads in the film starring as love interests opposite to Jiiva and Arulnithi respectively.

Jiiva] and Arulnithi both were taught the basic skills of the sport of kabaddi from few professional kabaddi players based from Karaikudi. The film director revealed that the kabaddi related sequences were shot on a set for about seven days which also featured real professional kabaddi players. Raju Sundaram served as the choreographer in the film. The portions of the film were predominantly shot in Chennai, Karaikudi and Thenkasi.

The title of the film and the first look poster of the film were unveiled by actor Dhanush via his Twitter account on 4 August 2019 indicating that the film was in post-production stage.

Soundtrack 
The music and background music of the film were scored by Yuvan Shankar Raja and lyrics for the songs were penned by Pa. Vijay and Viveka. The first single of the film Yaar Antha Oviyaththai was released on 26 October 2020 and opened to positive reviews from audience.

Release 
The shooting of the film was wrapped up in February 2020 but the theatrical release of the film was postponed on multiple occasions due to the COVID-19 pandemic. The film was initially supposed to hit the screens on 26 October 2020 but it was postponed due to the uncertainties caused by the impact of the COVID-19. The film release was later pushed back to 28 January 2021 after filmmakers regained hopes of releasing the film in theatres following the release of Master. However, the theatrical release of the film was rescheduled again for the third time on 5 February 2021.

References

External links 

 

2021 films
2020s Tamil-language films
2020s masala films
2020s sports drama films
Indian sports drama films
Indian action drama films
2021 action drama films
Films shot in Chennai
Films shot in Karaikudi
Sports action films
Films scored by Yuvan Shankar Raja
Super Good Films films